Otogi 2: Immortal Warriors, known in Japan as , is a hack and slash action game developed by FromSoftware and published by Sega. Otogi 2 is the sequel to Otogi: Myth of Demons. The game is backwards compatible on Xbox One and Xbox Series consoles.

Gameplay

Plot
Players assume the role of Raikoh Minamoto, the undead warrior charged with the task of vanquishing the demonic infestation that plagued Japan's sacred capital. Continuing where the original left off, Otogi 2 puts players in the role of Raikoh, who is summoned once again to destroy the invading demons. This time however, he's not alone, and with the help of some new allies, Raikoh and his loyal followers will set out to destroy the demons once and for all and prevent darkness from consuming the world.

Reception

The game received "generally favorable" reviews according to video game review aggregator Metacritic. In Japan, Famitsu gave it a score of one seven, two eights, and one seven, for a total of 30 out of 40. Otogi 2 was a runner-up for GameSpots 2004 "Best Voice Acting" award, which went to Grand Theft Auto: San Andreas.

The game sold poorly, however. Responding to a letter questioning why Electronic Gaming Monthly ran such a short review on Otogi 2, Dan Hsu, editor-in-chief of the publication, stated, "As good of a game Otogi 2 is, we still have to acknowledge that relatively few people want to read about it."

References

External links
 

2003 video games
Action-adventure games
FromSoftware games
Hack and slash games
Sega video games
Video games about demons
Video games based on Japanese mythology
Video game sequels
Video games set in feudal Japan
Xbox games
Xbox-only games
Single-player video games
Video games developed in Japan